Paul Buford Jordan (born June 26, 1962) is a former professional American football running back in the National Football League (NFL) for the New Orleans Saints.

Biography
A four-time all-Southland Conference selection, Jordan left McNeese State in 1983 as the all-time leading rusher in Louisiana history. He joined the New Orleans Breakers of the USFL and was their leading rusher in 1984 with 1276 yards and 8 touchdowns on the ground. He also played in the USFL for the Portland Breakers.

After the USFL folded in 1985, Jordan joined coach Jim Mora's Saints and started 9 games, playing mostly as a blocker for Dalton Hilliard and Reuben Mayes and as a special teams performer.

In a 1987 comeback against Cincinnati, he scored two touchdowns. In 1988, he had a 44-yard run against Atlanta and against Washington he recovered a Reuben Mayes fumble and turned it into a 7-yard score. In 1989, despite being hampered by injuries, he finished third in rushing and had another 2 touchdown day against Atlanta. Jordan was released prior to the beginning of the 1991 season, but returned and started in place of an injured Craig Heyward for the second half of the season.

In 1999, he was head coach of the New Orleans Thunder of the Regional Football League. He was also head coach of the Lafayette Roughnecks of the af2 in 2001 before being replaced by Dave Whinham.

In 2011, Jordan was selected for the Louisiana Sports Hall of Fame.  In 2013, he was named the Southland Conference's "player of the decade" for the 1980s, leading the 1980s All-Decade Team chosen by the conference in connection with its 50th anniversary celebrations.

Personal life

Jordan's son, Brandin Jordan, played college football for Southern Illinois University after playing his high school football for coach J.T. Curtis at John Curtis Christian High School.

Buford Jordan now provides home-based personal training and fitness training to individuals and sports teams.

References

External links
Official website
Buford Jordan at NFL.com

1962 births
Living people
People from Iota, Louisiana
American football running backs
New Orleans Saints players
Boston/New Orleans/Portland Breakers players
McNeese Cowboys football players
Players of American football from Louisiana
Lafayette Roughnecks coaches